Laura Rossouw (born 15 July 1946) is a South African former tennis player who was active in the late 1960s and first half of the 1970s.

Tennis career

During her career Rossouw won three singles and two doubles titles. She toured the European circuit for the first time in 1966.

Her best singles results at a Grand Slam tournament were reaching the third round at the 1966 and 1972 Wimbledon Championships. In the doubles and mixed doubles events she reached he quarterfinal on four occasions. In the doubles and mixed doubles events she reached he quarterfinal on four occasions.

In December 1970 Rossouw competed for the South African Fed Cup team in the World Group, winning three of the four matches she played.

Career finals

Singles (3 titles, 1 runner-up)

Doubles (2 titles, 4 runner-ups)

References

External links
 
 
 
 ITN Wimbledon film reel

South African female tennis players
1946 births
Living people
Sportspeople from Durban
White South African people